State Route 207 (SR 207), also known as Park Road, is a short  state highway in Lauderdale County, Tennessee. It connects SR 87 and the community of Fulton with Fort Pillow State Park. It is the primary road in and out of the park and is two-lane highway for its entire duration.

Major intersections

References

207
Transportation in Lauderdale County, Tennessee